Katherine Bennell-Pegg is an Australian aerospace engineer.

Career 

She has been the director of space technology at the Australian Space Agency since March 2022, based in Adelaide, South Australia.

Bennell-Pegg is preparing to undergo training to become an astronaut at the European Space Agency in Germany, after having applied to join the European Astronaut Corps as a British dual citizen in early 2021. She was one of only 25 people to successfully complete the selection process from a total of 22,500 people.

Her training to expected to conclude in May 2024. If successfully completed, Bennell-Pegg will become the first Australian woman to become an astronaut and will be eligible to be selected for missions to the International Space Station.

Bennell-Pegg was born in Sydney and grew up in Northern Beaches area. She has had a lifelong ambition of becoming an astronaut despite there being a lack of female representation in the astrophysics field.

Prior to joining the Australian Space Agency in 2019 as the assistant manager of space capability, robotics and automation, Bennell-Pegg served in the military for which she was awarded the Sword of Honour and the Sir Thomas Blamey Memorial Award.

She completed master's degrees at the Luleå University of Technology and Cranfield University as well as courses at the Massachusetts Institute of Technology and the University of Oxford before gaining experience at NASA, the European Space Agency and Airbus.

In 2022, Bennell-Pegg delivered The Warren Centre for Advanced Engineering Innovation Lecture.

In March 2023, she was named as the overall winner in addition to the winner of the Leader of the Year category at the Woman of the Year Awards in Adelaide.

References 

Aerospace engineers
Astronaut candidates
Luleå University of Technology alumni
Alumni of Cranfield University
Space programme of Australia
21st-century Australian scientists
21st-century Australian women scientists
Australian Army officers
Living people
Year of birth missing (living people)